The 2012 Missouri State Treasurer election was held on November 6, 2012, alongside the presidential and gubernatorial elections. Incumbent Democratic State Treasurer Clint Zweifel was re-elected to a second term against Republican State Representative Cole McNary.

Background
Clint Zweifel won the 2008 Missouri state treasurer election, narrowly defeating Republican candidate Brad Lager with 50.5% of the vote.

Timeline 
March 27, 2012 - Filing deadline for Democrats, Republicans and Libertarians
August 7, 2012 - Primary (gubernatorial and other statewide office) elections
August 21, 2012 - Filing deadline for other third parties and Independents
November 6, 2012 - General election.

Major candidates

Democratic
Clint Zweifel, incumbent State Treasurer

Republican
 Cole McNary, State Representative from the 86th District

Libertarian
Sean O'Toole

Results

See also
 2012 United States presidential election in Missouri
 2012 United States Senate election in Missouri
 2012 United States House of Representatives elections in Missouri
 2012 Missouri gubernatorial election
 2012 Missouri lieutenant gubernatorial election
 2012 Missouri Attorney General election
 2012 Missouri Secretary of State election

References

External links
Elections from the Missouri Secretary of State

Official campaign websites (Archived)
Cole McNary for State Treasurer
Clint Zweifel for State Treasurer

2012 Missouri elections
Missouri state treasurer elections
Missouri